Volvo is a Swedish manufacturing company. Related or formerly related companies include:
 Volvo Cars, an automobile manufacturer which has been owned since 2010 by the Chinese automotive company Geely Holding Group
 Volvo Trucks, a global truck manufacturer
 Volvo Buses, a global bus manufacturer

Volvo may also mean:

 Volvo International, a tennis tournament played on clay courts from 1973 to 1984 and on outdoor hard courts from 1985 to 1998
 Volvo Masters, a European Tour golf tournament played from 1988 to 2008
 Volvo Open, a golf tournament played in Sweden in 1970 and 1971
 Volvo Ocean Race, a yacht race around the world, formerly the "Whitbread Round the World Race"
 a nickname of Ndaye Mulamba (1948–2019), a former association footballer from the Democratic Republic of the Congo

See also
 List of Volvo passenger cars
Volva (disambiguation)
Vulva (disambiguation)